Lasse Bjerre Jensen (born 31 October 1993) is a speedway rider who won the 2010 Under-21 World Cup with the Denmark team.

Biography 
Bjerre was born in Esbjerg, Denmark in 1993. His brother, Kenneth (born 1984), is also a speedway rider. They have two sisters Janni and Lotte. Their parents are Ivan and Vibeke.

Bjerre was part of the Danish team that won the World under-21 Team Cup in 2010, and he won the Danish Under-21 Championship in 2011. He rode for King's Lynn Stars in the latter part of the 2010 season, and became a Peterborough Panthers asset towards the end of that year. He rode again for King's Lynn in 2011, doubling up with Ipswich Witches. He signed to ride for Peterborough Panthers in the Elite League in 2012 in a doubling-up role, and also in the Premier League with Leicester Lions with whom he continued to ride in 2013. In June 2012 he was dropped by Panthers.

In August 2012 he joined Swindon Robins.

Major championship performances

World Championships 
 Individual U-21 World Championship
 2010 - lost in the Qualifying Round Five
 Team U-21 World Championship
 2010 -  Rye House - Under-21 World Champion (5 pts)

European Championships 
 Individual U-19 European Championship
 2010 - lost in the Semi-Final Three
 Team U-19 European Championship
 2010 - lost in the Semi-Final One

References 

1993 births
Living people
People from Esbjerg
Danish speedway riders
Team Speedway Junior World Champions
Ipswich Witches riders
King's Lynn Stars riders
Leicester Lions riders
Peterborough Panthers riders
Sportspeople from the Region of Southern Denmark